Gadadhar Saha was an Indian politician belonging to the Communist Party of India (Marxist). He was elected to the Lok Sabha the lower house of Indian Parliament from Birbhum constituency in West Bengal state in 1971, 1977, 1980 and 1984.

References

External links
Official biographical sketch in Parliament of India website

1934 births
Communist Party of India (Marxist) politicians from West Bengal
People from Birbhum district
India MPs 1971–1977
India MPs 1977–1979
India MPs 1980–1984
India MPs 1984–1989
2000 deaths